Til the End of Forever is an album by Michael Bolton, released in 2005. The live cuts on this album were recorded during a DVD taping over two nights of concerts (August 24 and 25, 2004) at the Casino Rama, outside Toronto, Canada. The recording has been shown on the HDNet show "HDNet Concerts".  A DVD of the concerts was released for sale in Europe in late 2005 and was released for sale in the U.S. in March, 2006, and was titled "The Best of Michael Bolton Live."

The track "Courage In Your Eyes" was written by Bolton as a tribute to Coretta Scott King, and he performed the song in her honor at her funeral. "Til the End of Forever" was the single off the album, and was written by Bolton in honor of his love for his three daughters. "Said I Loved You ... But I Lied" is a reggae-styled remake of Bolton's 1993 hit of the same name.

The album constitutes Bolton's lowest charting album in the US. Less than 150,000 copies have been sold in the US and about 250,000 copies globally.

Track listing
Tracks 1–7 are studio recordings, while tracks 8–18 were recorded live in concert.
 "I'm Alive"
 "Til the End of Forever"
 "Still the Love of My Life"
 "Next Lifetime"
 "Hear Me""
 "Courage in Your Eyes
 "Said I Loved You...But I Lied" [Reggae Version]
Live Tracks
 "Time, Love and Tenderness"
 "When a Man Loves a Woman"
 "Go The Distance"
 "Nessun Dorma"
 "(Sittin' On) The Dock of the Bay" (Otis Redding)
 "To Love Somebody"
 "How Can We Be Lovers"
 "Love Is a Wonderful Thing"
 "Soul Provider"
 "Steel Bars"
 "How Am I Supposed to Live Without You"

References

Michael Bolton albums
2005 albums
2005 video albums
Live video albums
2005 live albums
Michael Bolton live albums
Michael Bolton video albums